The Mirage Tour in Autumn 1982 was a concert tour by British-American pop rock band Fleetwood Mac. The tour only lasting a few months. Unlike the extensive Tusk tour, the Mirage Tour was confined to just the US in 29 cities.

History of the tour 
This would be the last tour with Lindsey Buckingham with the band until The Dance in 1997. Although Buckingham would perform on and produce the next album, Tango in the Night, he did not tour and decided to leave the band.

Tragedy struck during the month of October when Nicks' best friend, Robin Anderson, died leaving Nicks in a total state of shock. As a result, she gave some of her most electrifying and heartfelt performances to date.

On October 18, the band played at a benefit concert organized by the City of Hope foundation. Nicks also played a solo set with her band and Don Henley appearing as a guest artist.

The October 15 and 20 shows were originally scheduled for early October, but had to be postponed because Nicks was ill, suffering from walking pneumonia.

The October 22 show at The Forum in Inglewood, was filmed and released in 1984 in VHS (and later in DVD) under the title "Fleetwood Mac In Concert - Mirage Tour '82".

Set list 
 "Second Hand News"
 "The Chain"
 "Don't Stop"
 "Dreams"
 "Oh Well"
 "Rhiannon"
 "Brown Eyes"
 "Eyes of the World"
 "Gypsy"
 "Love in Store"
 "Not That Funny"
 "Never Going Back Again"
 "Landslide"
 "Tusk"
 "Sara"
 "Hold Me"
 "You Make Loving Fun"
 "I'm So Afraid"
 "Go Your Own Way"

Encore
 "Blue Letter"
 "Sisters of the Moon"
 "Songbird"

Tour dates

Personnel
Mick Fleetwood – drums, percussion
John McVie – bass guitar
Christine McVie – Hammond B3 Organ, Yamaha CP-30, piano, accordion, maracas, tambourine, vocals
Lindsey Buckingham – guitar, vocals
Stevie Nicks – vocals, tambourine, cowbell

Certifications

References

1982 concert tours
Fleetwood Mac concert tours